Tim Ozinga is a Republican member of the Illinois House from the 37th district. The 37th district, located in the Chicago area, includes parts of Frankfort, Frankfort Square, Homer Glen, Joliet, Lockport, Mokena, New Lenox, Orland Park, Orland Hills, and Tinley Park.

Early life, education, and career
Tim Ozinga grew up in Mokena, Illinois. He attended Moraine Valley Community College and would attend Trinity Christian College, where he would earn a B.S. in business management and political science. Before earning his B.S., Ozinga took a short academic break to work on his father's congressional campaign in 2008. He earned an MBA from Kellogg School of Management and "completed the executive education program at Harvard Business School."

Ozinga is currently the co-owner and executive vice-president of Ozinga Bros, Inc., a "fourth-generation family business specializing in building materials and logistics" since 1928. Ozinga formerly served on the technology committee in Mokena, Illinois, as well as a commissioner on the economic development commission. He currently serves as board secretary for the Mokena Community Park District.

Ozinga is a member of the Illinois Republican Party's Central Committee as a representative from the Illinois's 1st congressional district and serves as Chairman of the Will County Republican Party.

Illinois House of Representatives
In the 2020 general election, Ozinga was elected to succeed fellow Republican and retiring Representative Margo McDermed. After the election, McDermed resigned several days before the end of her term in the 101st General Assembly. The Republican Representative Committee of the Republican Party of the 37th Representative District appointed Representative-elect Ozinga to serve the remainder of McDermed's term. He was sworn into office on January 5, 2021.

As of July 3rd, 2022, Ozinga is a member of the following Illinois House committees:

 Appropriations - Public Safety Committee (HAPP)
 Clean Energy Subcommittee (HENG-CLEA)
 Energy & Environment Committee (HENG)
 Ethics & Elections Committee (SHEE)
 Housing Committee (SHOU)
 Revenue & Finance Committee (HREF)
 Sales, Amusements, & Other Taxes Subcommittee (HREF-SATX)

Electoral history

References

External links

21st-century American politicians
Illinois Republicans
Living people
Kellogg School of Management alumni
Trinity Christian College alumni
Year of birth missing (living people)